Calla (bog arum, marsh calla, wild calla, squaw claw, and water-arum) is a genus of flowering plant in the family Araceae, containing the single species Calla palustris.

Description 
It is a rhizomatous herbaceous perennial plant growing in bogs and ponds. The fruit is a cluster of red berries, each berry containing several seeds.

The plant is very poisonous when fresh due to its high oxalic acid content, but the rhizome (like that of Caladium, Colocasia, and Arum) is edible after drying, grinding, leaching and boiling.

Taxonomy 
The genus formerly also included a number of other species, which have now been transferred to the separate genus Zantedeschia. These plants from tropical Africa, however, are still often termed "calla lilies" but should not be confused with C. palustris.

Distribution 
It is native to cool temperate regions of the Northern Hemisphere, in central, eastern and northern Europe (France and Norway eastward), northern Asia and northern North America (Alaska, Canada, and northeastern contiguous United States).

References

External links 
 
 
 
 Missouri Gardening, plant finder, Gardening Help
 North Carolina State University Cooperative Extension
 Connecticut Botanical Society, Wild Calla (Water Arum) 
 
 University Botanic Gardens at Ljubljana

Aroideae
Monotypic Araceae genera
Flora of North America
Flora of temperate Asia
Flora of Europe
Garden plants
House plants